Karchambu-e Jonubi Rural District is a rural district (dehestan) in the Karchambu District of Buin va Miandasht County, Isfahan Province, Iran. At the 2006 census, its population was 2,425, in 527 families.  The rural district has 8 villages.

References 

Rural Districts of Isfahan Province
Buin va Miandasht County